Neritoida was a taxonomic order of sea snails, freshwater snails and land snails, gastropod molluscs. This order was placed within the superorder Neritopsina within the order Orthogastropoda. Now see Neritoidea.

Superfamilies
Superfamilies within the order Neritoida were:
 Helicinoidea
 Hydrocenoidea
 Neritoidea
 Neritopsoidea
 Symmetrocapuloidea

References

Obsolete gastropod taxa